This is about the cruise ship. For the river cruise ship, see T. G. Shevchenko (1991).

MS  Taras Shevchenko was a cruise ship owned by the Soviet Union's Black Sea Shipping Company. She was built in 1966 by V.E.B. Mathias-Thesen Werft, Wismar, East Germany. She was scrapped in 2005 in Chittagong, Bangladesh. The ship was named after Ukrainian painter and poet Taras Shevchenko.

History

Taras Shevchenko was the third  built by V.E.B. Mathias-Thesen Werft for the Soviet Union. Originally she was planned as the last ship of the series, but the Soviet Union's national shipping company Morflot decided to order two additional sisters, which made her the middle sister. She was delivered to the Black Sea Shipping Company on 26 April 1966 and placed on cruise traffic. Sometime during her Soviet Union career the Taras Shevchenko was rebuilt with a larger forward superstructure. In 1989 she was chartered to Jahn Reisen for a five-year period. The Soviet Union broke up during this charter, and as a result of this the Taras Shevchenko was handed over to the state of Ukraine. Following the end of the Jahn Reisen charter in 1995, she was transferred to Blasco UK and re-flagged to Monrovia, Liberia. During the same year she was rebuilt at Odessa.

In 1997 Taras Shevchenko was sold to the Ukraine-based Ocean Agencies who used her for further cruise traffic. In June 1998, when she was about to depart on a three-week cruise, the ship was arrested in Piraeus, Greece due to the company's financial problems. In July 1998 the ship was laid up at Ilichevsk, where she remained for five years. In 2003 she was put back into service as a cruise ship by the Ukraine-based Antarktika JSC, who used her for cruises aimed at a Ukrainian cliente. This venture was not able to attract a viable charterer, and Taras Shevchenko was sold for scrap in 2004. Renamed Tara, scrappers in Alang, India were outbid, and "Tara" was scrapped in Chittagong, Bangladesh in 2005.

See also
 List of cruise ships
 T. G. Shevchenko (1991)

References

External links

 Simplon Postcards: Soviet Shipping Page 1: Soviet Built Ships

 

Cruise ships
Ships built in East Germany
Passenger ships of the Soviet Union
East Germany–Soviet Union relations
Ships of Ukraine
1965 ships
Ships built in Wismar
Ships of Black Sea Shipping Company